Schwerte (Westphalian: Schweierte) is a town in the district of Unna, in North Rhine-Westphalia, Germany.

Geography
Schwerte is situated in the Ruhr valley, at the south-east border of the Ruhr Area. South of Schwerte begins the mountainous Sauerland region.

Division of the town
After the local government reforms of 1975 Schwerte consists of the following districts:

 Schwerte
 Holzen
 Westhofen
 Ergste
 Geisecke
 Villigst
 Wandhofen

History
Schwerte received civic rights in the 12th century.

The railway facility in the eastern district of Schwerte became a branch of the Buchenwald concentration camp in April 1944. The camp had 445 prisoners in August and 670 in November 1944. The number of escapees was comparatively high; in November 1944 48 prisoners escaped. The camp in Schwerte was disbanded in December 1944 and the remaining prisoners were brought back to Buchenwald.

Main sights
The Romanesque church of St. Victor has a carved altar of 1523, and stained glass of the 14th and 15th centuries.
The Wuckenhof is a timber-framed house built in the 16th century.
The Ruhrtalmuseum is situated in a former town hall, that was built in 1547.
The Rohrmeisterei was built in 1889 by a water purification company. It was a pumping station until 1924. Today it is part of the German route of industrial heritage (Route der Industriekultur).

Economy
Today, there are some industries left, which are confined to the manufacture of iron and steel goods.

Twin towns – sister cities

Schwerte is twinned with:

 Béthune, France (1960)
 Bruay-la-Buissière, France (1965)
 Violaines, France (1969)
 Allouagne, France (1975)
 Hastings, England, UK (1982)
 Cava de' Tirreni, Italy (1984)
 Leppävirta, Finland (1992)
 Pyatigorsk, Russia (1992)

Notable people
Johannes Goddaeus (1555–1632), jurist
Heinrich Rehkemper (1894–1949), baritone singer
Erwin Rösener (1902–1946), SS-Obergruppenführer Nazi officer executed for war crimes
Werner van der Zyl (1902–1984), rabbi
Detlef Lewe (1939–2008), sprint canoer, lived in Schwerte
Paul Kevenhörster (born 1941), political scientist
Wolfgang Kleff (born 1946), footballer
Rosemarie Trockel (born 1952), artist
Carmen Rischer (born 1956), rhythmic gymnast
Thomas Kroth (born 1959), footballer, lives in Schwerte
Violetta Oblinger-Peters (born 1977), Austrian slalom canoeist
Jens Ewald (born 1983), slalom canoeist
Lasse Sobiech (born 1991), footballer

References

External links
Official website 
Heimatverein Ergste Internet site of the local history society of Ergste

Members of the Hanseatic League
Unna (district)